Fyfield and Tubney is a civil parish in The Vale of White Horse district of Oxfordshire, England. The parish was formed in 1952 when the parish of Fyfield was merged with the parish of Tubney. It was part of Berkshire until the 1974 boundary changes transferred it to Oxfordshire.

References

External links

Civil parishes in Oxfordshire
Vale of White Horse